Fort Knocks Entertainment is an American East Coast hip hop, pop and R&B record label and full-scale production house founded in 2004 by record producer Just Blaze.

Current roster

Artists

Affiliated labels
 Atlantic Records 
 Roc-A-Fella Records
 Def Jam Recordings
 Get Low Records

References

 http://www.mtv.com/overdrive/?id=1573987&vid=18799
https://www.discogs.com/label/91699-Fort-Knocks-Entertainment
https://mdpedia.net/view_html.php?sq=wrist%20brace&lang=en&q=Fort_Knocks_Entertainment

American record labels
Hip hop record labels
Vanity record labels
Atlantic Records
Record labels established in 2004